The 1975 Italian Grand Prix was a Formula One motor race held at Monza on 7 September 1975. It was race 13 of 14 in both the 1975 World Championship of Drivers and the 1975 International Cup for Formula One Manufacturers. It was the 45th Italian Grand Prix and the 41st to be held at Monza. The race held over 52 laps of the five kilometre circuit for a race distance of 300 kilometres.

The race was won by Swiss driver Clay Regazzoni in his Ferrari 312T in a glorious day for Scuderia Ferrari. It was Regazzoni's third win, Ferrari's fifth win for the season. Regazzoni took a sixteen-second win over the McLaren M23 of outgoing world champion, Brazilian driver Emerson Fittipaldi. Behind Fittipaldi was the second Ferrari of Austrian driver Niki Lauda.

Qualifying

Qualifying classification 

*Positions in red indicate entries that failed to qualify.

Race summary 

The Italian supporters were gathered in expectation of Ferrari gaining their first championship in 11 years-on home ground, with many Austrians travelling over the border to support Niki Lauda and were delighted when Ferrari filled both spaces on the front row. Tony Brise delighted his boss Graham Hill by gaining a third-row spot.

Lauda only needed to finish better than 6th to be champion; The only other driver who was mathematically eligible for the championship, Argentine Carlos Reutemann needed to win this race as well as the United States Grand Prix with Lauda out of the points in both races.

On Sunday morning there was a cloudburst and for some time the future of the race was in jeopardy, but the rain dried up with about an hour to go before the start. Clay Regazzoni led from Lauda and Jody Scheckter.

Vittorio Brambilla's clutch burnt out on the first lap, whilst Bob Evans halted with a failed engine plug. There was a chaotic accident at the chicane-Scheckter had to take to the escape road as around him Jochen Mass hit the kerb, damaging his car's suspension. Ronnie Peterson collided with another car, jamming his throttle open. Mario Andretti and Rolf Stommelen retired with accident damage and Brise spun across the chicane. Harald Ertl soared over the top of Hans-Joachim Stuck's car, damaging the uprights.

After six laps, Carlos Pace retired with a broken throttle link, soon joined by Hans-Joachim Stuck and Lella Lombardi. The Ferraris were circulating 1–2 with Clay Regazzoni leading majestically from Niki Lauda. On lap 14, Emerson Fittipaldi passed Carlos Reutemann for third place, and Reutemann's involvement in the championship was effectively over; he finished 4th in the race. Despite the Ferraris being way ahead, Fittipaldi would not give up the chase, carving down a gap of over ten seconds. With just six laps left, he managed to pass Lauda.

Meanwhile, Patrick Depailler had taken James Hunt for fifth only to spin off down the escape road. Hunt, Tom Pryce and Reutemann were duelling, Pryce taking the place when Hunt spun off on lap 27—but ceding it to him after a further ten laps. Harald Ertl was a lap down, but drove so well that Pryce could not overtake him.

Regazzoni took the flag, Fittapaldi was second, Lauda was third and it was enough for Lauda to secure his first world championship. Lauda's 16.5 point lead would be too much for Fittipaldi to bridge at the final round of the championship at the United States Grand Prix. With Regazzoni and Lauda scoring 13 points between them, Ferrari also secured the International Cup for Formula One Manufacturers, their first such win since 1964. Ferrari won the championship for the first time since 1961 in front of their home crowd.

Race classification

Championship standings after the race

Bold indicates world champions.
Drivers' Championship standings

Constructors' Championship standings

Note: Only the top five positions are included for both sets of standings. Only the best 6 results from the first 7 races and the best 6 results from the last 7 races counted towards the Championship. Numbers without parentheses are Championship points; numbers in parentheses are total points scored.

References

Italian Grand Prix
Italian Grand Prix
Grand Prix
Italian Grand Prix